Quincy Alexander (born ) is a Trinidad and Tobago male  track cyclist. He competed in the 3 events at the 2012 UCI Track Cycling World Championships.

External links
 Profile at cyclingarchives.com

References

1993 births
Living people
Trinidad and Tobago track cyclists
Trinidad and Tobago male cyclists
Place of birth missing (living people)
21st-century Trinidad and Tobago people